Virgin Radio Jakarta was an Indonesian radio station that was owned by the Milestone Pasific Group and was launched in Jakarta in May 2016.

History
In May 2016, Virgin Radio started with only one jockey named Vari (from Oz Radio). And then in late June 2016, it added one more jockey named Stefany. Not long after that in late 2016, Virgin Radio held a DJ audition, and added one more jockey named Canti. Advertisement kept running in prime time hours (6am-10am), together with its sister station Smooth FM.

In 2017, Virgin Radio Jakarta introduced its morning show named Breakfast Show with Vari and Canti as host, later Jerome replaced Canti in 2018, and in 2019 Canti was replaced by David.
There are also other programs; Virgin Radio Music Morning with Talitha, Virgin Radio Rush Hour with Aleef, Virgin Radio Hot Hits with Bukie, and New Song Sunday with Stefany.

On 26 November 2020, Virgin Radio Jakarta re-branded as Z 99.9

References

Virgin Radio
Radio stations in Jakarta